Parathesis palaciosii is a species of plant in the family Primulaceae. It is endemic to Ecuador.

References

Endemic flora of Ecuador
palaciosii
Vulnerable plants
Taxonomy articles created by Polbot